Order of Service is an Iranian state general order. For the first time, it was established and awarded during the Pahlavi dynasty and during the reign of Reza Shah. After Iranian Revolution it was re-established by "Council of Iran Ministers" in November 21, 1990. The order has three classes. According to Article 12 of the Regulations on the Awarding of Government Orders of Iran, the Order of Service awarded by President of Iran to recognize "achieving distinguished success" in one of the following:
 Truly and consistent efforts in accomplishing responsibility and servitude
 Aiding the oppressed and deprived people

Classes 
It comes in three classes:

Recipients

See also 
 Order of Merit and Management
 Order of Freedom (Iran)
 Order of Altruism
 Order of Work and Production
 Order of Research
 Order of Mehr
 Order of Justice (Iran)
 Order of Construction
 Order of Knowledge
 Order of Education and Pedagogy
 Order of Persian Politeness
 Order of Independence (Iran)
 Order of Courage (Iran)

References

External links 
 Iran Awarding of Government Orders website
 Types of Iran's Orders and their benefits (Persian)

CS1 uses Persian-language script (fa)
Awards established in 1990
Civil awards and decorations of Iran
1990 establishments in Iran